William A. Spangenthal is a retired United States Air Force major general who most recently was the deputy commander of the Air Education and Training Command. Prior to that, he was the director of operations and communications of the same command. He retired effective December 1, 2021.

References 

Living people
Year of birth missing (living people)
Place of birth missing (living people)
United States Air Force generals
Major generals